Richard Whittington is an academic in the area of Corporate Strategy. Currently, he is a Professor of Strategic Management at the Saïd Business School of the University of Oxford, and a Fellow of New College, Oxford. Whittington has been influential in the Strategy-as-Practice approach, a more sociological and less managerial approach to the study of business strategy. Whittington has two children, Georgina and Richard.

Works  
Whittington, R. (1996). Strategy as Practice. Long Range Planning, 731-735.
Whittington, R. (2001). What is Strategy- and does it matter? (2nd ed.). London: Thomson Learning.
Whittington, R. (2002). Practice Perspectives on Strategy: Unifying and Developing a Field.

References

External links 
Strategy as Practice Online Community

Year of birth missing (living people)
Living people
Academics of Saïd Business School
Fellows of New College, Oxford